The Secret Diary of an Exchange Student is a 2021 Brazilian comedy film directed by Bruno Garotti, written by Bruno Garotti and Sylvio Gonçalves and starring Larissa Manoela, Thati Lopes and Bruno Montaleone.<ref></ref

Cast 
 Larissa Manoela as Barbara
 Thati Lopes as Taila
 Bruno Montaleone as Lucas
 David Sherod as Brad (as David James)
 Kathy-Ann Hart as Sheryll
 Valeria Silva as Henza
 Ray Faiola as Jeff
 Noa Graham as Martha
 Maiara Walsh as Kat
 Emanuelle Araújo as Zoraia
 Tim Eliot as Mr. Fields
 Marcos Oliveira as Seu Hélio
 Flávia Garrafa as Regina
 Henry Jackelén as Agente Consular

References

External links 
 
 

2021 films
2021 comedy films
Brazilian comedy films
2020s Portuguese-language films
Portuguese-language Netflix original films